Malaria is a mosquito-borne infectious disease that affects humans and other animals. Malaria causes symptoms that typically include fever, tiredness, vomiting, and headaches. In severe cases, it can cause jaundice, seizures, coma, or death. Symptoms usually begin ten to fifteen days after being bitten by an infected mosquito. If not properly treated, people may have recurrences of the disease months later. In those who have recently survived an infection, reinfection usually causes milder symptoms. This partial resistance disappears over months to years if the person has no continuing exposure to malaria.

Malaria is caused by single-celled microorganisms of the Plasmodium group. It is spread exclusively through bites of infected Anopheles mosquitoes. The mosquito bite introduces the parasites from the mosquito's saliva into a person's blood. The parasites travel to the liver where they mature and reproduce. Five species of Plasmodium can infect and be spread by humans. Most deaths are caused by P. falciparum, whereas P. vivax, P. ovale, and P. malariae generally cause a milder form of malaria. The species P. knowlesi rarely causes disease in humans. Malaria is typically diagnosed by the microscopic examination of blood using blood films, or with antigen-based rapid diagnostic tests. Methods that use the polymerase chain reaction to detect the parasite's DNA have been developed, but they are not widely used in areas where malaria is common, due to their cost and complexity.

The risk of disease can be reduced by preventing mosquito bites through the use of mosquito nets and insect repellents or with mosquito-control measures such as spraying insecticides and draining standing water. Several medications are available to prevent malaria for travellers in areas where the disease is common. Occasional doses of the combination medication sulfadoxine/pyrimethamine are recommended in infants and after the first trimester of pregnancy in areas with high rates of malaria. As of 2020, there is one vaccine which has been shown to reduce the risk of malaria by about 40% in children in Africa. A pre-print study of another vaccine has shown 77% vaccine efficacy. Efforts to develop more effective vaccines are ongoing. The recommended treatment for malaria is a combination of antimalarial medications that includes artemisinin. The second medication may be either mefloquine, lumefantrine, or sulfadoxine/pyrimethamine. Quinine, along with doxycycline, may be used if artemisinin is not available. It is recommended that in areas where the disease is common, malaria is confirmed if possible before treatment is started due to concerns of increasing drug resistance. Resistance among the parasites has developed to several antimalarial medications; for example, chloroquine-resistant P. falciparum has spread to most malarial areas, and resistance to artemisinin has become a problem in some parts of Southeast Asia.

The disease is widespread in the tropical and subtropical regions that exist in a broad band around the equator. This includes much of sub-Saharan Africa, Asia, and Latin America. In 2020 there were 241 million cases of malaria worldwide resulting in an estimated 627,000 deaths. Approximately 95% of the cases and deaths occurred in sub-Saharan Africa. Rates of disease have decreased from 2010 to 2014 but increased from 2015 to 2020. Malaria is commonly associated with poverty and has a significant negative effect on economic development. In Africa, it is estimated to result in losses of US$12 billion a year due to increased healthcare costs, lost ability to work, and adverse effects on tourism.

Signs and complications

Adults with malaria tend to experience chills and fever – classically in periodic intense bouts lasting around six hours, followed by a period of sweating and fever relief – as well as headache, fatigue, abdominal discomfort, and muscle pain. Children tend to have more general symptoms: fever, cough, vomiting, and diarrhea.

Initial manifestations of the disease—common to all malaria species—are similar to flu-like symptoms, and can resemble other conditions such as sepsis, gastroenteritis, and viral diseases. The presentation may include headache, fever, shivering, joint pain, vomiting, hemolytic anemia, jaundice, hemoglobin in the urine, retinal damage, and convulsions.

The classic symptom of malaria is paroxysm—a cyclical occurrence of sudden coldness followed by shivering and then fever and sweating, occurring every two days (tertian fever) in P. vivax and P. ovale infections, and every three days (quartan fever) for P. malariae. P. falciparum infection can cause recurrent fever every 36–48 hours, or a less pronounced and almost continuous fever.

Symptoms typically begin 10–15 days after the initial mosquito bite, but can occur as late as several months after infection with some P. vivax strains. Travellers taking preventative malaria medications may develop symptoms once they stop taking the drugs.

Severe malaria is usually caused by P. falciparum (often referred to as falciparum malaria). Symptoms of falciparum malaria arise 9–30 days after infection. Individuals with cerebral malaria frequently exhibit neurological symptoms, including abnormal posturing, nystagmus, conjugate gaze palsy (failure of the eyes to turn together in the same direction), opisthotonus, seizures, or coma.

Complications
Malaria has several serious complications. Among these is the development of respiratory distress, which occurs in up to 25% of adults and 40% of children with severe P. falciparum malaria. Possible causes include respiratory compensation of metabolic acidosis, noncardiogenic pulmonary oedema, concomitant pneumonia, and severe anaemia. Although rare in young children with severe malaria, acute respiratory distress syndrome occurs in 5–25% of adults and up to 29% of pregnant women. Coinfection of HIV with malaria increases mortality. Kidney failure is a feature of blackwater fever, where haemoglobin from lysed red blood cells leaks into the urine.

Infection with P. falciparum may result in cerebral malaria, a form of severe malaria that involves encephalopathy. It is associated with retinal whitening, which may be a useful clinical sign in distinguishing malaria from other causes of fever. An enlarged spleen, enlarged liver or both of these, severe headache, low blood sugar, and haemoglobin in the urine with kidney failure may occur. Complications may include spontaneous bleeding, coagulopathy, and shock.

Malaria in pregnant women is an important cause of stillbirths, infant mortality, miscarriage and low birth weight, particularly in P. falciparum infection, but also with P. vivax.

Cause
Malaria is caused by infection with parasites in the genus Plasmodium. In humans, malaria is caused by six Plasmodium species: P. falciparum, P. malariae, P. ovale curtisi, P. ovale wallikeri, P. vivax and P. knowlesi. Among those infected, P. falciparum is the most common species identified (~75%) followed by P. vivax (~20%). Although P. falciparum traditionally accounts for the majority of deaths, recent evidence suggests that P. vivax malaria is associated with potentially life-threatening conditions about as often as with a diagnosis of P. falciparum infection. P. vivax proportionally is more common outside Africa. There have been documented human infections with several species of Plasmodium from higher apes; however, except for P. knowlesi—a zoonotic species that causes malaria in macaques—these are mostly of limited public health importance.

Parasites are typically introduced by the bite of an infected Anopheles mosquito. What these inoculated parasites, called "sporozoites", do in the skin and lymphatics, exactly, has yet to be accurately determined. However, a percentage of sporozoites follow the bloodstream to the liver, where they invade hepatocytes. They grow and divide in the liver for 2–10 days, with each infected hepatocyte eventually harboring up to 40,000 parasites. The infected hepatocytes break down, releasing this invasive form of Plasmodium cells, called "merozoites" into the bloodstream. In the blood, the merozoites rapidly invade individual red blood cells, replicating over 24–72 hours to form 16–32 new merozoites. The infected red blood cell lyses, and the new merozoites infect new red blood cells, resulting in a cycle that continuously amplifies the number of parasites in an infected person. However, most of the P. vivax replicating merozoite biomass is now (since 2021) known to be hidden in the spleen and bone marrow (perhaps elsewhere too), thereby supporting the astute, long-standing (since 2011) but previously ignored theory that non-circulating merozoites are the source many P. vivax malarial recurrences (see “Recurrent malaria” section below). Over rounds of this red blood cell infection cycle in the bloodstream and elsewhere, a small portion of parasites do not replicate, but instead develop into early sexual stage parasites called male and female "gametocytes". These gametocytes develop in the bone marrow for 11 days, then return to the blood circulation to await uptake by the bite of another mosquito. Once inside a mosquito, the gametocytes undergo sexual reproduction, and eventually form daughter sporozoites that migrate to the mosquito's salivary glands to be injected into a new host when the mosquito bites.

The liver infection causes no symptoms; all symptoms of malaria result from the infection of red blood cells. Symptoms develop once there are more than around 100,000 parasites per milliliter of blood. Many of the symptoms associated with severe malaria are caused by the tendency of P. falciparum to bind to blood vessel walls, resulting in damage to the affected vessels and surrounding tissue. Parasites sequestered in the blood vessels of the lung contribute to respiratory failure. In the brain, they contribute to coma. In the placenta they contribute to low birthweight and preterm labor, and increase the risk of abortion and stillbirth. The destruction of red blood cells during infection often results in anemia, exacerbated by reduced production of new red blood cells during infection.

Only female mosquitoes feed on blood; male mosquitoes feed on plant nectar and do not transmit the disease. Females of the mosquito genus Anopheles prefer to feed at night. They usually start searching for a meal at dusk, and continue through the night until they succeed. Malaria parasites can also be transmitted by blood transfusions, although this is rare.

Recurrent malaria
Symptoms of malaria can recur after varying symptom-free periods. Depending upon the cause, recurrence can be classified as recrudescence, relapse, or reinfection. Recrudescence is when symptoms return after a symptom-free period and the origin is parasites that survived in the blood as a result of inadequate or ineffective treatment. Relapse is when symptoms reappear after the parasites have been eliminated from the blood and the recurrence source is activated parasites which had persisted as dormant hypnozoites in liver cells. Relapse commonly occurs after 8–24 weeks and is often seen in P. vivax and P. ovale infections. However, relapse-like P. vivax recurrences are probably being over-attributed to hypnozoite activation. Some of them might have an extra-vascular or sequestered merozoite origin, making those recurrences recrudescences, not relapses. Newly recognised, non-hypnozoite, possible contributing sources to recurrent peripheral P. vivax parasitemia are erythrocytic forms in the bone marrow and spleen. P. vivax malaria cases in temperate areas often involve overwintering by hypnozoites, with relapses beginning the year after the mosquito bite. Reinfection means that the parasites responsible for the past infection were eliminated from the body but a new parasite(s) was introduced. Reinfection cannot readily be distinguished from relapse and recrudescence, although recurrence of infection within two weeks of treatment for the initial malarial manifestations is typically attributed to treatment failure. But doing this is not necessarily correct. People may develop some immunity when exposed to frequent infections.

Pathophysiology

Malaria infection develops via two phases: one that involves the liver (exoerythrocytic phase), and one that involves red blood cells, or erythrocytes (erythrocytic phase). When an infected mosquito pierces a person's skin to take a blood meal, sporozoites in the mosquito's saliva enter the bloodstream and migrate to the liver where they infect hepatocytes, multiplying asexually and asymptomatically for a period of 8–30 days.

After a potential dormant period in the liver, these organisms differentiate to yield thousands of merozoites, which, following rupture of their host cells, escape into the blood and infect red blood cells to begin the erythrocytic stage of the life cycle. The parasite escapes from the liver undetected by wrapping itself in the cell membrane of the infected host liver cell.

Within the red blood cells, the parasites multiply further, again asexually, periodically breaking out of their host cells to invade fresh red blood cells. Several such amplification cycles occur. Thus, classical descriptions of waves of fever arise from simultaneous waves of merozoites escaping and infecting red blood cells.

Some P. vivax sporozoites do not immediately develop into exoerythrocytic-phase merozoites, but instead, produce hypnozoites that remain dormant for periods ranging from several months (7–10 months is typical) to several years. After a period of dormancy, they reactivate and produce merozoites. Hypnozoites are responsible for long incubation and late relapses in P. vivax infections, although their existence in P. ovale is uncertain.

The parasite is relatively protected from attack by the body's immune system because for most of its human life cycle it resides within the liver and blood cells and is relatively invisible to immune surveillance. However, circulating infected blood cells are destroyed in the spleen. To avoid this fate, the P. falciparum parasite displays adhesive proteins on the surface of the infected blood cells, causing the blood cells to stick to the walls of small blood vessels, thereby sequestering the parasite from passage through the general circulation and the spleen. The blockage of the microvasculature causes symptoms such as those in placental malaria. Sequestered red blood cells can breach the blood–brain barrier and cause cerebral malaria.

Genetic resistance

According to a 2005 review, due to the high levels of mortality and morbidity caused by malaria—especially the P. falciparum species—it has placed the greatest selective pressure on the human genome in recent history. Several genetic factors provide some resistance to it including sickle cell trait, thalassaemia traits, glucose-6-phosphate dehydrogenase deficiency, and the absence of Duffy antigens on red blood cells.

The impact of sickle cell trait on malaria immunity illustrates some evolutionary trade-offs that have occurred because of endemic malaria. Sickle cell trait causes a change in the haemoglobin molecule in the blood. Normally, red blood cells have a very flexible, biconcave shape that allows them to move through narrow capillaries; however, when the modified haemoglobin S molecules are exposed to low amounts of oxygen, or crowd together due to dehydration, they can stick together forming strands that cause the cell to distort into a curved sickle shape. In these strands, the molecule is not as effective in taking or releasing oxygen, and the cell is not flexible enough to circulate freely. In the early stages of malaria, the parasite can cause infected red cells to sickle, and so they are removed from circulation sooner. This reduces the frequency with which malaria parasites complete their life cycle in the cell. Individuals who are homozygous (with two copies of the abnormal haemoglobin beta allele) have sickle-cell anaemia, while those who are heterozygous (with one abnormal allele and one normal allele) experience resistance to malaria without severe anaemia. Although the shorter life expectancy for those with the homozygous condition would tend to disfavour the trait's survival, the trait is preserved in malaria-prone regions because of the benefits provided by the heterozygous form.

Liver dysfunction
Liver dysfunction as a result of malaria is uncommon and usually only occurs in those with another liver condition such as viral hepatitis or chronic liver disease. The syndrome is sometimes called malarial hepatitis. While it has been considered a rare occurrence, malarial hepatopathy has seen an increase, particularly in Southeast Asia and India. Liver compromise in people with malaria correlates with a greater likelihood of complications and death.

Diagnosis

Due to the non-specific nature of malaria symptoms, diagnosis is typically suspected based on symptoms and travel history, then confirmed with a laboratory test to detect the presence of the parasite in the blood (parasitological test). In areas where malaria is common, the World Health Organization (WHO) recommends clinicians suspect malaria in any person who reports having fevers, or who has a current temperature above 37.5 °C without any other obvious cause. Malaria should be suspected in children with signs of anemia: pale palms or a laboratory test showing hemoglobin levels below 8 grams per deciliter of blood. In areas of the world with little to no malaria, the WHO recommends only testing people with possible exposure to malaria (typically travel to a malaria-endemic area) and unexplained fever.

Malaria is usually confirmed by the microscopic examination of blood films or by antigen-based rapid diagnostic tests (RDT). Microscopy – i.e. examining Giemsa-stained blood with a light microscope – is the gold standard for malaria diagnosis. Microscopists typically examine both a "thick film" of blood, allowing them to scan many blood cells in a short time, and a "thin film" of blood, allowing them to clearly see individual parasites and identify the infecting Plasmodium species. Under typical field laboratory conditions, a microscopist can detect parasites when there are at least 100 parasites per microliter of blood, which is around the lower range of symptomatic infection. Microscopic diagnosis is relatively resource intensive, requiring trained personnel, specific equipment, electricity, and a consistent supply of microscopy slides and stains.

In places where microscopy is unavailable, malaria is diagnosed with RDTs, rapid antigen tests that detect parasite proteins in a fingerstick blood sample. A variety of RDTs are commercially available, targeting the parasite proteins histidine rich protein 2 (HRP2, detects P. falciparum only), lactate dehydrogenase, or aldolase. The HRP2 test is widely used in Africa, where P. falciparum predominates. However, since HRP2 persists in the blood for up to five weeks after an infection is treated, an HRP2 test sometimes cannot distinguish whether someone currently has malaria or previously had it. Additionally, some P. falciparum parasites in the Amazon region lack the HRP2 gene, complicating detection. RDTs are fast and easily deployed to places without full diagnostic laboratories. However they give considerably less information than microscopy, and sometimes vary in quality from producer to producer and lot to lot.

Serological tests to detect antibodies against Plasmodium from the blood have been developed, but are not used for malaria diagnosis due to their relatively poor sensitivity and specificity. Highly sensitive nucleic acid amplification tests have been developed, but are not used clinically due to their relatively high cost, and poor specificity for active infections.

Classification
Malaria is classified into either "severe" or "uncomplicated" by the World Health Organization (WHO). It is deemed severe when any of the following criteria are present, otherwise it is considered uncomplicated.
 Decreased consciousness
 Significant weakness such that the person is unable to walk
 Inability to feed
 Two or more convulsions
 Low blood pressure (less than 70 mmHg in adults and 50 mmHg in children)
 Breathing problems
 Circulatory shock
 Kidney failure or haemoglobin in the urine
 Bleeding problems, or hemoglobin less than 50 g/L (5 g/dL)
 Pulmonary oedema
 Blood glucose less than 2.2 mmol/L (40 mg/dL)
 Acidosis or lactate levels of greater than 5 mmol/L
 A parasite level in the blood of greater than 100,000 per microlitre (μL) in low-intensity transmission areas, or 250,000 per μL in high-intensity transmission areas

Cerebral malaria is defined as a severe P. falciparum-malaria presenting with neurological symptoms, including coma (with a Glasgow coma scale less than 11, or a Blantyre coma scale less than 3), or with a coma that lasts longer than 30 minutes after a seizure.

Prevention

Methods used to prevent malaria include medications, mosquito elimination and the prevention of bites. As of 2020, there is one vaccine for malaria (known as RTS,S) which is licensed for use. The presence of malaria in an area requires a combination of high human population density, high Anopheles mosquito population density and high rates of transmission from humans to mosquitoes and from mosquitoes to humans. If any of these is lowered sufficiently, the parasite eventually disappears from that area, as happened in North America, Europe, and parts of the Middle East. However, unless the parasite is eliminated from the whole world, it could re-establish if conditions revert to a combination that favors the parasite's reproduction. Furthermore, the cost per person of eliminating anopheles mosquitoes rises with decreasing population density, making it economically unfeasible in some areas.

Prevention of malaria may be more cost-effective than treatment of the disease in the long run, but the initial costs required are out of reach of many of the world's poorest people. There is a wide difference in the costs of control (i.e. maintenance of low endemicity) and elimination programs between countries. For example, in China—whose government in 2010 announced a strategy to pursue malaria elimination in the Chinese provinces—the required investment is a small proportion of public expenditure on health. In contrast, a similar programme in Tanzania would cost an estimated one-fifth of the public health budget. In 2021, the World Health Organization confirms that China has eliminated malaria.

In areas where malaria is common, children under five years old often have anaemia, which is sometimes due to malaria. Giving children with anaemia in these areas preventive antimalarial medication improves red blood cell levels slightly but does not affect the risk of death or need for hospitalisation.

Mosquito control

Vector control refers to methods used to decrease malaria by reducing the levels of transmission by mosquitoes. For individual protection, the most effective insect repellents are based on DEET or picaridin. However, there is insufficient evidence that mosquito repellents can prevent malaria infection. Insecticide-treated nets (ITNs) and indoor residual spraying (IRS) are effective, have been commonly used to prevent malaria, and their use has contributed significantly to the decrease in malaria in the 21st century. ITNs and IRS may not be sufficient to eliminate the disease, as these interventions depend on how many people use nets, how many gaps in insecticide there are (low coverage areas), if people are not protected when outside of the home, and an increase in mosquitoes that are resistant to insecticides. Modifications to people's houses to prevent mosquito exposure may be an important long term prevention measure.

Insecticide-treated nets

Mosquito nets help keep mosquitoes away from people and reduce infection rates and transmission of malaria. Nets are not a perfect barrier and are often treated with an insecticide designed to kill the mosquito before it has time to find a way past the net. Insecticide-treated nets (ITNs) are estimated to be twice as effective as untreated nets and offer greater than 70% protection compared with no net. Between 2000 and 2008, the use of ITNs saved the lives of an estimated 250,000 infants in Sub-Saharan Africa. About 13% of households in Sub-Saharan countries owned ITNs in 2007 and 31% of African households were estimated to own at least one ITN in 2008. In 2000, 1.7 million (1.8%) African children living in areas of the world where malaria is common were protected by an ITN. That number increased to 20.3 million (18.5%) African children using ITNs in 2007, leaving 89.6 million children unprotected and to 68% African children using mosquito nets in 2015. Most nets are impregnated with pyrethroids, a class of insecticides with low toxicity. They are most effective when used from dusk to dawn. It is recommended to hang a large "bed net" above the center of a bed and either tuck the edges under the mattress or make sure it is large enough such that it touches the ground. ITNs are beneficial towards pregnancy outcomes in malaria-endemic regions in Africa but more data is needed in Asia and Latin America.

In areas of high malaria resistance, piperonyl butoxide (PBO) combined with pyrethroids in mosquito netting is effective in reducing malaria infection rates.  Questions remain concerning the durability of PBO on nets as the impact on mosquito mortality was not sustained after twenty washes in experimental trials.

Indoor residual spraying
Indoor residual spraying is the spraying of insecticides on the walls inside a home. After feeding, many mosquitoes rest on a nearby surface while digesting the bloodmeal, so if the walls of houses have been coated with insecticides, the resting mosquitoes can be killed before they can bite another person and transfer the malaria parasite. As of 2006, the World Health Organization recommends 12 insecticides in IRS operations, including DDT and the pyrethroids cyfluthrin and deltamethrin. This public health use of small amounts of DDT is permitted under the Stockholm Convention, which prohibits its agricultural use. One problem with all forms of IRS is insecticide resistance. Mosquitoes affected by IRS tend to rest and live indoors, and due to the irritation caused by spraying, their descendants tend to rest and live outdoors, meaning that they are less affected by the IRS. Communities using insecticide treated nets, in addition to indoor residual spraying with 'non-pyrethroid-like' insecticides found associated reductions in malaria.  Additionally, the use of 'pyrethroid-like' insecticides in addition to indoor residual spraying did not result in a detectable additional benefit in communities using insecticide treated nets.

Housing modifications 
Housing is a risk factor for malaria and modifying the house as a prevention measure may be a sustainable strategy that does not rely on the effectiveness of insecticides such as pyrethroids. The physical environment inside and outside the home that may improve the density of mosquitoes are considerations. Examples of potential modifications include how close the home is to mosquito breeding sites, drainage and water supply near the home, availability of mosquito resting sites (vegetation around the home), the proximity to live stock and domestic animals, and physical improvements or modifications to the design of the home to prevent mosquitoes from entering.

Other mosquito control methods
People have tried a number of other methods to reduce mosquito bites and slow the spread of malaria. Efforts to decrease mosquito larvae by decreasing the availability of open water where they develop, or by adding substances to decrease their development, are effective in some locations. Electronic mosquito repellent devices, which make very high-frequency sounds that are supposed to keep female mosquitoes away, have no supporting evidence of effectiveness. There is a low certainty evidence that fogging may have an effect on malaria transmission. Larviciding by hand delivery of chemical or microbial insecticides into water bodies containing low larval distribution may reduce malarial transmission. There is insufficient evidence to determine whether larvivorous fish can decrease mosquito density and transmission in the area.

Medications

There are a number of medications that can help prevent or interrupt malaria in travellers to places where infection is common. Many of these medications are also used in treatment. In places where Plasmodium is resistant to one or more medications, three medications—mefloquine, doxycycline, or the combination of atovaquone/proguanil (Malarone)—are frequently used for prevention. Doxycycline and the atovaquone/proguanil are better tolerated while mefloquine is taken once a week. Areas of the world with chloroquine-sensitive malaria are uncommon. Antimalarial mass drug administration to an entire population at the same time may reduce the risk of contracting malaria in the population, however the effectiveness of mass drug administration may vary depending on the prevalence of malaria in the area. Other factors such as drug administration plus other protective measures such as mosiquito control, the proportion of people treated in the area, and the risk of reinfection with malaria may play a role in the effectiveness of mass drug treatment approaches.

The protective effect does not begin immediately, and people visiting areas where malaria exists usually start taking the drugs one to two weeks before they arrive, and continue taking them for four weeks after leaving (except for atovaquone/proguanil, which only needs to be started two days before and continued for seven days afterward). The use of preventive drugs is often not practical for those who live in areas where malaria exists, and their use is usually given only to pregnant women and short-term visitors. This is due to the cost of the drugs, side effects from long-term use, and the difficulty in obtaining antimalarial drugs outside of wealthy nations. During pregnancy, medication to prevent malaria has been found to improve the weight of the baby at birth and decrease the risk of anaemia in the mother. The use of preventive drugs where malaria-bearing mosquitoes are present may encourage the development of partial resistance.

Giving antimalarial drugs to infants through intermittent preventive therapy can reduce the risk of having malaria infection, hospital admission, and anaemia.

Mefloquine is more effective than sulfadoxine-pyrimethamine in preventing malaria for HIV-negative pregnant women. Cotrimoxazole is effective in preventing malaria infection and reduce the risk of getting anaemia in HIV-positive women. Giving sulfadoxine-pyrimethamine for three or more doses as intermittent preventive therapy is superior than two doses for HIV-positive women living in malaria-endemic areas.

Prompt treatment of confirmed cases with artemisinin-based combination therapies (ACTs) may also reduce transmission.

Others
Community participation and health education strategies promoting awareness of malaria and the importance of control measures have been successfully used to reduce the incidence of malaria in some areas of the developing world. Recognising the disease in the early stages can prevent it from becoming fatal. Education can also inform people to cover over areas of stagnant, still water, such as water tanks that are ideal breeding grounds for the parasite and mosquito, thus cutting down the risk of the transmission between people. This is generally used in urban areas where there are large centers of population in a confined space and transmission would be most likely in these areas. Intermittent preventive therapy is another intervention that has been used successfully to control malaria in pregnant women and infants, and in preschool children where transmission is seasonal.

Treatment

Malaria is treated with antimalarial medications; the ones used depends on the type and severity of the disease. While medications against fever are commonly used, their effects on outcomes are not clear. Providing free antimalarial drugs to households may reduce childhood deaths when used appropriately. Programmes which presumptively treat all causes of fever with antimalarial drugs may lead to overuse of antimalarials and undertreat other causes of fever. Nevertheless, the use of malaria rapid-diagnostic kits can help to reduce over-usage of antimalarials.

Uncomplicated malaria
Simple or uncomplicated malaria may be treated with oral medications. Artemisinin drugs are effective and safe in treating uncomplicated malaria. Artemisinin in combination with other antimalarials (known as artemisinin-combination therapy, or ACT) is about 90% effective when used to treat uncomplicated malaria. The most effective treatment for P. falciparum infection is the use of ACT, which decreases resistance to any single drug component. Artemether-lumefantrine (six-dose regimen) is more effective than the artemether-lumefantrine (four-dose regimen) or other regimens not containing artemisinin derivatives in treating falciparum malaria. Another recommended combination is dihydroartemisinin and piperaquine. Artemisinin-naphthoquine combination therapy showed promising results in treating falciparum malaria. However, more research is needed to establish its efficacy as a reliable treatment. Artesunate plus mefloquine performs better than mefloquine alone in treating uncomplicated falciparum malaria in low transmission settings. Atovaquone-proguanil is effective against uncomplicated falciparum with a possible failure rate of 5% to 10%; the addition of artesunate may reduce failure rate. Azithromycin monotherapy or combination therapy has not shown effectiveness in treating plasmodium or vivax malaria. Amodiaquine plus sulfadoxine-pyrimethamine may achieve less treatment failures when compared to sulfadoxine-pyrimethamine alone in uncomplicated falciparum malaria. There is insufficient data on chlorproguanil-dapsone in treating uncomplicated falciparum malaria. The addition of primaquine with artemisinin-based combination therapy for falciparum malaria reduces its transmission at day 3-4 and day 8 of infection. Sulfadoxine-pyrimethamine plus artesunate is better than sulfadoxine-pyrimethamine plus amodiaquine in controlling treatment failure at day 28. However, the latter is better than the former in reducing gametocytes in blood at day 7.

Infection with P. vivax, P. ovale or P. malariae usually does not require hospitalisation. Treatment of P. vivax malaria requires both elimination of blood stages (using chloroquine or artemisinin-based combination therapy) and clearance of liver forms with an 8-aminoquinoline agent such as primaquine or tafenoquine.

The view that 8-aminoquinoline drugs kill parasites in the liver is the conventional one. However, there are reasons to believe that primaquine might, to a currently unknown extent, also inactivate non-circulating, extra-hepatic merozoites (clarity in this regard is expected to be forthcoming soon).

To treat malaria during pregnancy, the WHO recommends the use of quinine plus clindamycin early in the pregnancy (1st trimester), and ACT in later stages (2nd and 3rd trimesters). There is limited safety data on the antimalarial drugs in pregnancy.

Severe and complicated malaria
Cases of severe and complicated malaria are almost always caused by infection with P. falciparum. The other species usually cause only febrile disease. Severe and complicated malaria cases are medical emergencies since mortality rates are high (10% to 50%).

Recommended treatment for severe malaria is the intravenous use of antimalarial drugs. For severe malaria, parenteral artesunate was superior to quinine in both children and adults. In another systematic review, artemisinin derivatives (artemether and arteether) were as efficacious as quinine in the treatment of cerebral malaria in children. Treatment of severe malaria involves supportive measures that are best done in a critical care unit. This includes the management of high fevers and the seizures that may result from it. It also includes monitoring for poor breathing effort, low blood sugar, and low blood potassium. Artemisinin derivatives have the same or better efficacy than quinolones in preventing deaths in severe or complicated malaria. Quinine loading dose helps to shorten the duration of fever and increases parasite clearance from the body. There is no difference in effectiveness when using intrarectal quinine compared to intravenous or intramuscular quinine in treating uncomplicated/complicated falciparum malaria. There is insufficient evidence for intramuscular arteether to treat severe malaria. The provision of rectal artesunate before transfer to hospital may reduce the rate of death for children with severe malaria. In children with malaria and concomitant hypoglycaemia, sublingual administration of glucose appears to result in better increases in blood sugar after 20 minutes when compared to oral administration, based on very limited data.

Cerebral malaria is the form of severe and complicated malaria with the worst neurological symptoms. There is insufficient data on whether osmotic agents such as mannitol or urea are effective in treating cerebral malaria. Routine phenobarbitone in cerebral malaria is associated with fewer convulsions but possibly more deaths. There is no evidence that steroids would bring treatment benefits for cerebral malaria.

Managing Cerebral Malaria

Cerebral malaria usually makes a patient comatose, if the cause of the coma is in doubt, test for other locally prevalent causes of encephalopathy (bacterial, viral or fungal infection) should be carried out. In areas where there is a high prevalence of malaria infection (e.g. tropical region) treatment can start without testing first. To manage the cerebral malaria when confirmed the following can be done:

 Patients in coma should be given meticulous nursing care ( monitor vital signs, turn patient every 2 hours, avoid lying the patient in a wet bed etc.)
 A sterile urethral catheter should be inserted to help with urinating
 To aspirate stomach content, a sterile nasogastric tube should be inserted.
 In the occasion of convulsions, a slow intravenous injection of benzodiazepine is administered.

There is insufficient evidence to show that blood transfusion is useful in either reducing deaths for children with severe anaemia or in improving their haematocrit in one month. There is insufficient evidence that iron chelating agents such as deferoxamine and deferiprone improve outcomes of those with malaria falciparum infection.

Monclonal antibodies
A 2022 clinical trial shows that a monoclonal antibody mAb L9LS offers protection against malaria. It binds the Plasmodium falciparum circumsporozoite protein (CSP-1), essential to disease, and makes it ineffective.

Resistance
Drug resistance poses a growing problem in 21st-century malaria treatment. In the 2000s (decade), malaria with partial resistance to artemisins emerged in Southeast Asia. Resistance is now common against all classes of antimalarial drugs apart from artemisinins. Treatment of resistant strains became increasingly dependent on this class of drugs. The cost of artemisinins limits their use in the developing world. Malaria strains found on the Cambodia–Thailand border are resistant to combination therapies that include artemisinins, and may, therefore, be untreatable. Exposure of the parasite population to artemisinin monotherapies in subtherapeutic doses for over 30 years and the availability of substandard artemisinins likely drove the selection of the resistant phenotype. Resistance to artemisinin has been detected in Cambodia, Myanmar, Thailand, and Vietnam, and there has been emerging resistance in Laos. Resistance to the combination of artemisinin and piperaquine was first detected in 2013 in Cambodia, and by 2019 had spread across Cambodia and into Laos, Thailand and Vietnam (with up to 80 percent of malaria parasites resistant in some regions).

There is insufficient evidence in unit packaged antimalarial drugs in preventing treatment failures of malaria infection. However, if supported by training of healthcare providers and patient information, there is improvement in compliance of those receiving treatment.

Prognosis

When properly treated, people with malaria can usually expect a complete recovery. However, severe malaria can progress extremely rapidly and cause death within hours or days. In the most severe cases of the disease, fatality rates can reach 20%, even with intensive care and treatment. Over the longer term, developmental impairments have been documented in children who have had episodes of severe malaria. Chronic infection without severe disease can occur in an immune-deficiency syndrome associated with a decreased responsiveness to Salmonella bacteria and the Epstein–Barr virus.

During childhood, malaria causes anaemia during a period of rapid brain development, and also direct brain damage resulting from cerebral malaria. Some survivors of cerebral malaria have an increased risk of neurological and cognitive deficits, behavioural disorders, and epilepsy. Malaria prophylaxis was shown to improve cognitive function and school performance in clinical trials when compared to placebo groups.

Epidemiology

The WHO estimates that in 2019 there were 229 million new cases of malaria resulting in 409,000 deaths. Children under 5 years old are the most affected, accounting for 67% of malaria deaths worldwide in 2019. About 125 million pregnant women are at risk of infection each year; in Sub-Saharan Africa, maternal malaria is associated with up to 200,000 estimated infant deaths yearly. There are about 10,000 malaria cases per year in Western Europe, and 1300–1500 in the United States. The United States eradicated malaria as a major public health concern in 1951, though small outbreaks persist. About 900 people died from the disease in Europe between 1993 and 2003. Both the global incidence of disease and resulting mortality have declined in recent years. According to the WHO and UNICEF, deaths attributable to malaria in 2015 were reduced by 60% from a 2000 estimate of 985,000, largely due to the widespread use of insecticide-treated nets and artemisinin-based combination therapies. In 2012, there were 207 million cases of malaria. That year, the disease is estimated to have killed between 473,000 and 789,000 people, many of whom were children in Africa. Efforts at decreasing the disease in Africa since 2000 have been partially effective, with rates of the disease dropping by an estimated forty percent on the continent.

Malaria is presently endemic in a broad band around the equator, in areas of the Americas, many parts of Asia, and much of Africa; in Sub-Saharan Africa, 85–90% of malaria fatalities occur. An estimate for 2009 reported that countries with the highest death rate per 100,000 of population were Ivory Coast (86.15), Angola (56.93) and Burkina Faso (50.66). A 2010 estimate indicated the deadliest countries per population were Burkina Faso, Mozambique and Mali. The Malaria Atlas Project aims to map global levels of malaria, providing a way to determine the global spatial limits of the disease and to assess disease burden. This effort led to the publication of a map of P. falciparum endemicity in 2010 and an update in 2019. As of 2010, about 100 countries have endemic malaria. Every year, 125 million international travellers visit these countries, and more than 30,000 contract the disease.

The geographic distribution of malaria within large regions is complex, and malaria-afflicted and malaria-free areas are often found close to each other. Malaria is prevalent in tropical and subtropical regions because of rainfall, consistent high temperatures and high humidity, along with stagnant waters where mosquito larvae readily mature, providing them with the environment they need for continuous breeding. In drier areas, outbreaks of malaria have been predicted with reasonable accuracy by mapping rainfall. Malaria is more common in rural areas than in cities. For example, several cities in the Greater Mekong Subregion of Southeast Asia are essentially malaria-free, but the disease is prevalent in many rural regions, including along international borders and forest fringes. In contrast, malaria in Africa is present in both rural and urban areas, though the risk is lower in the larger cities.

Climate change

Climate change is likely to affect malaria transmission, but the degree of effect and the areas affected is uncertain. Greater rainfall in certain areas of India, and following an El Niño event is associated with increased mosquito numbers.

Since 1900 there has been substantial change in temperature and rainfall over Africa. However, factors that contribute to how rainfall results in water for mosquito breeding are complex, incorporating the extent to which it is absorbed into soil and vegetation for example, or rates of runoff and evaporation. Recent research has provided a more in-depth picture of conditions across Africa, combining a malaria climatic suitability model with a continental-scale model representing real-world hydrological processes.

History

Although the parasite responsible for P. falciparum malaria has been in existence for 50,000–100,000 years, the population size of the parasite did not increase until about 10,000 years ago, concurrently with advances in agriculture and the development of human settlements. Close relatives of the human malaria parasites remain common in chimpanzees. Some evidence suggests that the P. falciparum malaria may have originated in gorillas.

References to the unique periodic fevers of malaria are found throughout history. Hippocrates described periodic fevers, labelling them tertian, quartan, subtertian and quotidian. The Roman Columella associated the disease with insects from swamps. Malaria may have contributed to the decline of the Roman Empire, and was so pervasive in Rome that it was known as the "Roman fever". Several regions in ancient Rome were considered at-risk for the disease because of the favourable conditions present for malaria vectors. This included areas such as southern Italy, the island of Sardinia, the Pontine Marshes, the lower regions of coastal Etruria and the city of Rome along the Tiber. The presence of stagnant water in these places was preferred by mosquitoes for breeding grounds. Irrigated gardens, swamp-like grounds, run-off from agriculture, and drainage problems from road construction led to the increase of standing water.

The term malaria originates from Mediaeval —"miasma theory"; the disease was formerly called ague or marsh fever due to its association with swamps and marshland. The term appeared in English at least as early as 1768. Malaria was once common in most of Europe and North America, where it is no longer endemic, though imported cases do occur.

Malaria is not referenced in the medical books of the Mayans or Aztecs. Despite this, antibodies against malaria have been detected in some South American mummies, indicating that some malaria strains in the Americas might have a pre-Columbian origin. European settlers and the West Africans they enslaved likely brought malaria to the Americas starting in the 16th century.

Scientific studies on malaria made their first significant advance in 1880, when Charles Louis Alphonse Laveran—a French army doctor working in the military hospital of Constantine in Algeria—observed parasites inside the red blood cells of infected people for the first time. He, therefore, proposed that malaria is caused by this organism, the first time a protist was identified as causing disease. For this and later discoveries, he was awarded the 1907 Nobel Prize for Physiology or Medicine. A year later, Carlos Finlay, a Cuban doctor treating people with yellow fever in Havana, provided strong evidence that mosquitoes were transmitting disease to and from humans. This work followed earlier suggestions by Josiah C. Nott, and work by Sir Patrick Manson, the "father of tropical medicine", on the transmission of filariasis.

In April 1894, a Scottish physician, Sir Ronald Ross, visited Sir Patrick Manson at his house on Queen Anne Street, London. This visit was the start of four years of collaboration and fervent research that culminated in 1897 when Ross, who was working in the Presidency General Hospital in Calcutta, proved the complete life-cycle of the malaria parasite in mosquitoes. He thus proved that the mosquito was the vector for malaria in humans by showing that certain mosquito species transmit malaria to birds. He isolated malaria parasites from the salivary glands of mosquitoes that had fed on infected birds. For this work, Ross received the 1902 Nobel Prize in Medicine. After resigning from the Indian Medical Service, Ross worked at the newly established Liverpool School of Tropical Medicine and directed malaria-control efforts in Egypt, Panama, Greece and Mauritius. The findings of Finlay and Ross were later confirmed by a medical board headed by Walter Reed in 1900. Its recommendations were implemented by William C. Gorgas in the health measures undertaken during construction of the Panama Canal. This public-health work saved the lives of thousands of workers and helped develop the methods used in future public-health campaigns against the disease.

In 1896, Amico Bignami discussed the role of mosquitoes in malaria. In 1898, Bignami, Giovanni Battista Grassi and Giuseppe Bastianelli succeeded in showing experimentally the transmission of malaria in humans, using infected mosquitoes to contract malaria themselves which they presented in November 1898 to the Accademia dei Lincei.

The first effective treatment for malaria came from the bark of cinchona tree, which contains quinine. This tree grows on the slopes of the Andes, mainly in Peru. The indigenous peoples of Peru made a tincture of cinchona to control fever. Its effectiveness against malaria was found and the Jesuits introduced the treatment to Europe around 1640; by 1677, it was included in the London Pharmacopoeia as an antimalarial treatment. It was not until 1820 that the active ingredient, quinine, was extracted from the bark, isolated and named by the French chemists Pierre Joseph Pelletier and Joseph Bienaimé Caventou.

Quinine was the predominant malarial medication until the 1920s when other medications began to appear. In the 1940s, chloroquine replaced quinine as the treatment of both uncomplicated and severe malaria until resistance supervened, first in Southeast Asia and South America in the 1950s and then globally in the 1980s.

The medicinal value of Artemisia annua has been used by Chinese herbalists in traditional Chinese medicines for 2,000 years. In 1596, Li Shizhen recommended tea made from qinghao specifically to treat malaria symptoms in his "Compendium of Materia Medica". Artemisinins, discovered by Chinese scientist Tu Youyou and colleagues in the 1970s from the plant Artemisia annua, became the recommended treatment for P. falciparum malaria, administered in severe cases in combination with other antimalarials. Tu says she was influenced by a traditional Chinese herbal medicine source, The Handbook of Prescriptions for Emergency Treatments, written in 340 by Ge Hong. For her work on malaria, Tu Youyou received the 2015 Nobel Prize in Physiology or Medicine.

Plasmodium vivax was used between 1917 and the 1940s for malariotherapy—deliberate injection of malaria parasites to induce a fever to combat certain diseases such as tertiary syphilis. In 1927, the inventor of this technique, Julius Wagner-Jauregg, received the Nobel Prize in Physiology or Medicine for his discoveries. The technique was dangerous, killing about 15% of patients, so it is no longer in use.

The first pesticide used for indoor residual spraying was DDT. Although it was initially used exclusively to combat malaria, its use quickly spread to agriculture. In time, pest control, rather than disease control, came to dominate DDT use, and this large-scale agricultural use led to the evolution of pesticide-resistant mosquitoes in many regions. The DDT resistance shown by Anopheles mosquitoes can be compared to antibiotic resistance shown by bacteria. During the 1960s, awareness of the negative consequences of its indiscriminate use increased, ultimately leading to bans on agricultural applications of DDT in many countries in the 1970s. Before DDT, malaria was successfully eliminated or controlled in tropical areas like Brazil and Egypt by removing or poisoning the breeding grounds of the mosquitoes or the aquatic habitats of the larval stages, for example by applying the highly toxic arsenic compound Paris Green to places with standing water.

Malaria vaccines have been another goal of research. The first promising studies demonstrating the potential for a malaria vaccine were performed in 1967 by immunising mice with live, radiation-attenuated sporozoites, which provided significant protection to the mice upon subsequent injection with normal, viable sporozoites. Since the 1970s, there has been considerable progress in developing similar vaccination strategies for humans. The first vaccine, called RTS,S, was approved by European regulators in 2015.

Names
Various types of malaria have been called by the names below:

Eradication efforts

Malaria has been successfully eliminated or significantly reduced in certain areas, but not globally. Malaria was once common in the United States, but the US eliminated malaria from most parts of the country in the early 20th century using vector control programs, which combined the monitoring and treatment of infected humans, draining of wetland breeding grounds for agriculture and other changes in water management practices, and advances in sanitation, including greater use of glass windows and screens in dwellings.  The use of the pesticide DDT and other means eliminated malaria from the remaining pockets in southern states of the US the 1950s, as part of the National Malaria Eradication Program.  Most of Europe, North America, Australia, North Africa and the Caribbean, and parts of South America, Asia and Southern Africa have also eliminated malaria. The WHO defines "elimination" (or "malaria-free") as having no domestic transmission (indigenous cases) for the past three years. They also define "pre-elimination" and "elimination" stages when a country has fewer than 5 or 1, respectively, cases per 1000 people at risk per year.

In 1955 the WHO launched the Global Malaria Eradication Program (GMEP), which supported substantial reductions in malaria cases in some countries, including India. However, due to vector and parasite resistance and other factors, the feasibility of eradicating malaria with the strategy used at the time and resources available led to waning support for the program. WHO suspended the program in 1969.

Target 6C of the Millennium Development Goals included reversal of the global increase in malaria incidence by 2015, with specific targets for children under 5 years old.  Since 2000, support for malaria eradication increased, although some actors in the global health community (including voices within the WHO) view malaria eradication as a premature goal and suggest that the establishment of strict deadlines for malaria eradication may be counterproductive as they are likely to be missed.

In 2006, the organization Malaria No More set a public goal of eliminating malaria from Africa by 2015, and the organization claimed they planned to dissolve if that goal was accomplished. In 2007, World Malaria Day was established by the 60th session of the World Health Assembly. As of 2018, they are still functioning. 

, The Global Fund to Fight AIDS, Tuberculosis, and Malaria has distributed 230 million insecticide-treated nets intended to stop mosquito-borne transmission of malaria. The U.S.-based Clinton Foundation has worked to manage demand and stabilize prices in the artemisinin market. Other efforts, such as the Malaria Atlas Project, focus on analysing climate and weather information required to accurately predict malaria spread based on the availability of habitat of malaria-carrying parasites. The Malaria Policy Advisory Committee (MPAC) of the World Health Organization (WHO) was formed in 2012, "to provide strategic advice and technical input to WHO on all aspects of malaria control and elimination".  In November 2013, WHO and the malaria vaccine funders group set a goal to develop vaccines designed to interrupt malaria transmission with malaria eradication's long-term goal.

In 2015 the WHO targeted a 90% reduction in malaria deaths by 2030, and Bill Gates said in 2016 that he thought global eradication would be possible by 2040. According to the WHO's World Malaria Report 2015, the global mortality rate for malaria fell by 60% between 2000 and 2015. The WHO targeted a further 90% reduction between 2015 and 2030, with a 40% reduction and eradication in 10 countries by 2020. However, the 2020 goal was missed with a slight increase in cases compared to 2015.

Before 2016, the Global Fund against HIV/AIDS, Tuberculosis and Malaria had provided 659 million ITN (insecticide treated bed nets), organise support and education to prevents malaria. The challenges are high due to the lack of funds, the fragile health structure and the remote indigenous population that could be hard to reach and educate. Most of indigenous population rely on self-diagnosis, self-treatment, healer, and traditional medicine. The WHO applied for fund to the Gates Foundation which favour the action of malaria eradication in 2007. Six countries, the United Arab Emirates, Morocco, Armenia, Turkmenistan, Kyrgyzstan, and Sri Lanka managed to have no endemic cases of  malaria for three consecutive years and certified malaria-free by the WHO despite the stagnation of the funding in 2010. The funding is essential to finance the cost of medication and hospitalisation cannot be supported by the poor countries where the disease is widely spread. The goal of eradication has not been met; nevertheless, the decrease rate of the disease is considerable.

While 31 out of 92 endemic countries were estimated to be on track with the WHO goals for 2020, 15 countries reported an increase of 40% or more between 2015 and 2020. Between 2000 and 30 June 2021, twelve countries were certified by the WHO as being malaria-free.  Argentina and Algeria were declared free of malaria in 2019. El Salvador and China were declared malaria-free in the first half of 2021.

Regional disparities were evident: Southeast Asia was on track to meet WHO's 2020 goals, while Africa, Americas, Eastern Mediterranean and West Pacific regions were off-track.  The six Greater Mekong Subregion countries aim for elimination of P. falciparum transmitted malaria by 2025 and elimination of all malaria by 2030, having achieved a 97% and 90% reduction of cases respectively since 2000. Ahead of World Malaria Day, 25 April 2021, WHO named 25 countries in which it is working to eliminate malaria by 2025 as part of its E-2025 initiative.

A major challenge to malaria elimination is the persistence of malaria in border regions, making international cooperation crucial.

One of the targets of Goal 3 of the UN's Sustainable Development Goals is to end the malaria epidemic in all countries by 2030.

In 2018, WHO announced that Paraguay was free of malaria, after a national malaria eradication effort that began in 1950.

As of 2019, the eradication process is ongoing, but it will be difficult to achieve a world free of malaria with the current approaches and tools. Only one malaria vaccine is licensed for use, and it shows relatively low effectiveness, while several other vaccine candidates in clinical trials aim to provide protection for children in endemic areas and reduce the speed of malaria transmission. Approaches may require investing more in research and greater primary health care. Continuing surveillance will also be important to prevent the return of malaria in countries where the disease has been eliminated.

Society and culture

Economic impact 

Malaria is not just a disease commonly associated with poverty: some evidence suggests that it is also a cause of poverty and a major hindrance to economic development. Although tropical regions are most affected, malaria's furthest influence reaches into some temperate zones that have extreme seasonal changes. The disease has been associated with major negative economic effects on regions where it is widespread. During the late 19th and early 20th centuries, it was a major factor in the slow economic development of the American southern states.

A comparison of average per capita GDP in 1995, adjusted for parity of purchasing power, between countries with malaria and countries without malaria gives a fivefold difference (US$1,526 versus US$8,268). In the period 1965 to 1990, countries where malaria was common had an average per capita GDP that increased only 0.4% per year, compared to 2.4% per year in other countries.

Poverty can increase the risk of malaria since those in poverty do not have the financial capacities to prevent or treat the disease. In its entirety, the economic impact of malaria has been estimated to cost Africa US$12 billion every year. The economic impact includes costs of health care, working days lost due to sickness, days lost in education, decreased productivity due to brain damage from cerebral malaria, and loss of investment and tourism. The disease has a heavy burden in some countries, where it may be responsible for 30–50% of hospital admissions, up to 50% of outpatient visits, and up to 40% of public health spending.

Cerebral malaria is one of the leading causes of neurological disabilities in African children. Studies comparing cognitive functions before and after treatment for severe malarial illness continued to show significantly impaired school performance and cognitive abilities even after recovery. Consequently, severe and cerebral malaria have far-reaching socioeconomic consequences that extend beyond the immediate effects of the disease.

Counterfeit and substandard drugs
Sophisticated counterfeits have been found in several Asian countries such as Cambodia, China, Indonesia, Laos, Thailand, and Vietnam, and are a major cause of avoidable death in those countries. The WHO said that studies indicate that up to 40% of artesunate-based malaria medications are counterfeit, especially in the Greater Mekong region. They have established a rapid alert system to rapidly report information about counterfeit drugs to relevant authorities in participating countries. There is no reliable way for doctors or lay people to detect counterfeit drugs without help from a laboratory. Companies are attempting to combat the persistence of counterfeit drugs by using new technology to provide security from source to distribution.

Another clinical and public health concern is the proliferation of substandard antimalarial medicines resulting from inappropriate concentration of ingredients, contamination with other drugs or toxic impurities, poor quality ingredients, poor stability and inadequate packaging. A 2012 study demonstrated that roughly one-third of antimalarial medications in Southeast Asia and Sub-Saharan Africa failed chemical analysis, packaging analysis, or were falsified.

War

Throughout history, the contraction of malaria has played a prominent role in the fates of government rulers, nation-states, military personnel, and military actions. In 1910, Nobel Prize in Medicine-winner Ronald Ross (himself a malaria survivor), published a book titled The Prevention of Malaria that included a chapter titled "The Prevention of Malaria in War". The chapter's author, Colonel C. H. Melville, Professor of Hygiene at Royal Army Medical College in London, addressed the prominent role that malaria has historically played during wars: "The history of malaria in war might almost be taken to be the history of war itself, certainly the history of war in the Christian era. ... It is probably the case that many of the so-called camp fevers, and probably also a considerable proportion of the camp dysentery, of the wars of the sixteenth, seventeenth and eighteenth centuries were malarial in origin." In British-occupied India the cocktail gin and tonic may have come about as a way of taking quinine, known for its antimalarial properties.

Malaria was the most significant health hazard encountered by U.S. troops in the South Pacific during World War II, where about 500,000 men were infected. According to Joseph Patrick Byrne, "Sixty thousand American soldiers died of malaria during the African and South Pacific campaigns."

Significant financial investments have been made to procure existing and create new antimalarial agents. During World War I and World War II, inconsistent supplies of the natural antimalaria drugs cinchona bark and quinine prompted substantial funding into research and development of other drugs and vaccines. American military organisations conducting such research initiatives include the Navy Medical Research Center, Walter Reed Army Institute of Research, and the U.S. Army Medical Research Institute of Infectious Diseases of the US Armed Forces.

Additionally, initiatives have been founded such as Malaria Control in War Areas (MCWA), established in 1942, and its successor, the Communicable Disease Center (now known as the Centers for Disease Control and Prevention, or CDC) established in 1946. According to the CDC, MCWA "was established to control malaria around military training bases in the southern United States and its territories, where malaria was still problematic".

Research
The Malaria Eradication Research Agenda (malERA) initiative was a consultative process to identify which areas of research and development (R&D) must be addressed for worldwide eradication of malaria.

Vaccine

A vaccine against malaria called RTS,S/AS01 (RTS,S) was approved by European regulators in 2015. As of 2019 it is undergoing pilot trials in 3 sub-Saharan African countries – Ghana, Kenya and Malawi – as part of the WHO's Malaria Vaccine Implementation Programme (MVIP).
 
Immunity (or, more accurately, tolerance) to P. falciparum malaria does occur naturally, but only in response to years of repeated infection. An individual can be protected from a P. falciparum infection if they receive about a thousand bites from mosquitoes that carry a version of the parasite rendered non-infective by a dose of X-ray irradiation. The highly polymorphic nature of many P. falciparum proteins results in significant challenges to vaccine design. Vaccine candidates that target antigens on gametes, zygotes, or ookinetes in the mosquito midgut aim to block the transmission of malaria. These transmission-blocking vaccines induce antibodies in the human blood; when a mosquito takes a blood meal from a protected individual, these antibodies prevent the parasite from completing its development in the mosquito. Other vaccine candidates, targeting the blood-stage of the parasite's life cycle, have been inadequate on their own. For example, SPf66 was tested extensively in areas where the disease was common in the 1990s, but trials showed it to be insufficiently effective.

In 2021, researchers from the University of Oxford reported findings from a Phase IIb trial of a candidate malaria vaccine, R21/Matrix-M, which demonstrated efficacy of 77% over 12-months of follow-up. This vaccine is the first to meet the World Health Organization's Malaria Vaccine Technology Roadmap goal of a vaccine with at least 75% efficacy.

Medications
Malaria parasites contain apicoplasts, organelles related to the plastids found in plants, complete with their own genomes. These apicoplasts are thought to have originated through the endosymbiosis of algae and play a crucial role in various aspects of parasite metabolism, such as fatty acid biosynthesis. Over 400 proteins have been found to be produced by apicoplasts and these are now being investigated as possible targets for novel antimalarial drugs.

With the onset of drug-resistant Plasmodium parasites, new strategies are being developed to combat the widespread disease. One such approach lies in the introduction of synthetic pyridoxal-amino acid adducts, which are taken up by the parasite and ultimately interfere with its ability to create several essential B vitamins. Antimalarial drugs using synthetic metal-based complexes are attracting research interest.
 (+)-SJ733: Part of a wider class of experimental drugs called spiroindolone. It inhibits the ATP4 protein of infected red blood cells that cause the cells to shrink and become rigid like the aging cells. This triggers the immune system to eliminate the infected cells from the system as demonstrated in a mouse model. As of 2014, a Phase 1 clinical trial to assess the safety profile in human is planned by the Howard Hughes Medical Institute.
 NITD246 and NITD609: Also belonged to the class of spiroindolone and target the ATP4 protein.

On the basis of molecular docking outcomes, compounds 3j, 4b, 4h, 4m were exhibited selectivity towards PfLDH. The post docking analysis displayed stable dynamic behavior of all the selected compounds compared to Chloroquine. The end state thermodynamics analysis stated 3j compound as a selective and potent PfLDH inhibitor.

New targets
Targeting Plasmodium liver-stage parasites selectively is emerging as an alternative strategy in the face of resistance to the latest frontline combination therapies against blood stages of the parasite.

In a research conducted in 2019, using experimental analysis with knockout (KO) mutants of Plasmodium berguei the authors were able to identify genes that are potentially essential in the liver stage. Moreover, they generated a computational model to analyse pre–erytrocytic development and liver–stage metabolism. Combining both methods they identified seven metabolic subsystems that become essential compared to the blood stage. Some of these metabolic pathways are fatty acid synthesis and elongation, tricarboxylic acid, amino acid and heme metabolism among others.

Specifically, they studied 3 subsystems: fatty acid synthesis and elongation, and amino sugar biosynthesis. For the first two pathways they demonstrated a clear dependence of the liver stage on its own fatty acid metabolism.

They proved for the first time the critical role of amino sugar biosynthesis in the liver stage of P. berghei. The uptake of N–acetyl–glucosamine appears to be limited in the liver stage, being its synthesis needed for the parasite development.

These findings and the computational model provide a basis for the design of antimalarial therapies targeting metabolic proteins.

Other
A non-chemical vector control strategy involves genetic manipulation of malaria mosquitoes. Advances in genetic engineering technologies make it possible to introduce foreign DNA into the mosquito genome and either decrease the lifespan of the mosquito, or make it more resistant to the malaria parasite. Sterile insect technique is a genetic control method whereby large numbers of sterile male mosquitoes are reared and released. Mating with wild females reduces the wild population in the subsequent generation; repeated releases eventually eliminate the target population.

Genomics is central to malaria research. With the sequencing of P. falciparum, one of its vectors Anopheles gambiae, and the human genome, the genetics of all three organisms in the malaria life cycle can be studied. Another new application of genetic technology is the ability to produce genetically modified mosquitoes that do not transmit malaria, potentially allowing biological control of malaria transmission.

In one study, a genetically modified strain of Anopheles stephensi was created that no longer supported malaria transmission, and this resistance was passed down to mosquito offspring.

Gene drive is a technique for changing wild populations, for instance to combat or eliminate insects so they cannot transmit diseases (in particular mosquitoes in the cases of malaria, zika, dengue and yellow fever).

In December 2020, a review article found that malaria-endemic regions had lower reported COVID-19 case fatality rates on average than regions where malaria was not known to be endemic.

Additionally, research conducted in 2015 demonstrated that in mice, malaria co-infection with the nematode Nippostrongylus brasiliensis, a pulmonary migrating helminth, has dampened the virulence of the Plasmodium parasite. Researchers demonstrated bottom-up control of malaria infection by the nematode; specifically, nematode infection leads to increased destruction of erythrocytes. It is known that Plasmodium prefers older host erythrocytes, which are easier for it to infect, so increased destruction, causing subsequent increased erythropoiesis, leads to an overall younger erythrocyte population resulting in a decrease in Plasmodium population. Interestingly, this disease control is largely independent of host immune control of Plasmodium, and may provide interesting insights for future treatment.

Other animals
While there are no animal reservoirs for the strains of malaria that cause human infections, nearly 200 parasitic Plasmodium species have been identified that infect birds, reptiles, and other mammals, and about 30 species naturally infect non-human primates. Some malaria parasites that affect non-human primates (NHP) serve as model organisms for human malarial parasites, such as P. coatneyi (a model for P. falciparum) and P. cynomolgi (P. vivax). Diagnostic techniques used to detect parasites in NHP are similar to those employed for humans. Malaria parasites that infect rodents are widely used as models in research, such as P. berghei. Avian malaria primarily affects species of the order Passeriformes, and poses a substantial threat to birds of Hawaii, the Galapagos, and other archipelagoes. The parasite P. relictum is known to play a role in limiting the distribution and abundance of endemic Hawaiian birds. Global warming is expected to increase the prevalence and global distribution of avian malaria, as elevated temperatures provide optimal conditions for parasite reproduction.

References

Citations

Sources

Further reading

External links

 WHO site on malaria
 CDC site on malaria
 PAHO site on malaria

 
Malaria
Insect-borne diseases
Infectious diseases with eradication efforts
Protozoal diseases
Tropical diseases
Vaccine-preventable diseases
Articles containing video clips